Bathylychnops is a genus of barreleyes.

Species
There are currently three recognized species in this genus:
 Bathylychnops brachyrhynchus (A. E. Parr, 1937)
 Bathylychnops chilensis Parin, Belyanina & Evseenko, 2009
 Bathylychnops exilis Cohen, 1958 (Javelin spookfish)

References

Opisthoproctidae